Maryland Million Classic is an American Thoroughbred horse race held annually in October since 1986 primarily at Laurel Park Racecourse in Laurel, Maryland or at Pimlico Race Course in Baltimore. To be eligible for the Maryland Million Classic, a horse must be sired by a stallion who stands in Maryland. Due to that restriction the race is classified as a non-graded or "listed" stakes race and is not eligible for grading by the American Graded Stakes Committee.

The race is part of Maryland Million Day, an 11-race program held in mid October that was the creation of renowned television sports journalist Jim McKay. The "Maryland Million" is the first State-Bred showcase event ever created. Since 1986, 27 other events in 20 states have imitated the showcase and its structure.

From its inception in 1986 through 1992, the race was run on dirt at a distance of one mile. From 1993 though 2008, it has been a  mile competition.  Since 2009, it has been a  mile event and currently offers a purse of $150,000. In addition to the prize money, the winning owner receives a Maryland Million Waterford Crystal bowl.

In its 30th running in 2015, the race was restricted to those horses who were sired by a stallion who stands in the state of Maryland. Both the entrant horse and their stallion had to be nominated to the Maryland Million program.

The race itself has had many titles since 1986 due in large part to the aggressive marketing efforts of Maryland Million Limited, the series corporate founder. In its first seven years, from 1986 through 1992, the race was called the "Budweiser Maryland Million Classic." From 1993 through 1996 the race was known as the "First National Bank of Maryland Classic." From 1997 through 2004 the race was known as the "Cosamin DS Maryland Classic."

Records 

Speed record: 
  mile - 1:50.26 - Sumacha’hot (2009)
  miles - 1:54.00 - Taking Risks (1994) & Frugal Doc (1996)
  mile - 2:01.00 - Mister S. M. (1988)

Most wins by a horse: - Five horses have won the Maryland Million Classic twice:
 3 - Eighttofasttocatch (2011, 2013, 2014)
 2 - Admirals War Chest (2015, 2016)
 2 - Docent (2002 & 2003)
 2 - Algar (horse)|Algar (1997 & 1998)
 2 - Timely Warning (1990 & 1991)
 
Most wins by an owner:
 3 - Anderson Fowler

Most wins by a jockey:
 3 - Edgar Prado
 3 - Jeremy Rose

Most wins by a trainer:
 3 - Timothy F. Ritchey
 3 - Virgil W. Raines

Winners of the Maryland Million Classic since 1986

See also 
 Maryland Million Classic top three finishers
 Maryland Million Day
 Laurel Park Racecourse

References

Maryland Million Official Site

Horse races in Maryland
Laurel Park Racecourse
Recurring sporting events established in 1986
1986 establishments in Maryland